"Shake That" is a 2005 Eminem song.

"Shake That" may also refer to:
"Shake That!", a song by Scooter, 2004
"Shake That" (Samantha Jade song), 2015
"Shake That!!", a song by Band-Maid from New Beginning, 2015